Xu Rui (born June 6, 1995) is a Chinese freestyle wrestler. She competed in the women's freestyle 63 kg event at the 2016 Summer Olympics, in which she was eliminated in the quarterfinals by Inna Trazhukova.

References

External links
 

1995 births
Living people
Chinese female sport wrestlers
Olympic wrestlers of China
Wrestlers at the 2016 Summer Olympics
Wrestlers at the 2018 Asian Games
Asian Games competitors for China
21st-century Chinese women